Arctic Monkeys are a British indie rock band from Sheffield, England. Formed in 2002, Arctic Monkeys currently consists of Alex Turner on lead vocals and guitar, Jamie Cook on guitar, Matt Helders on drums and backing vocals, and Nick O'Malley on bass guitar and backing vocals, a position formerly held by Andy Nicholson. The band's initial popularity came from fan-made demo tapes and online file sharing, and were heralded as one of the first acts to come to the public attention via the Internet. Commentators suggested at the time that they represented the possibility of a change in the way in which new bands are promoted and marketed. The band eventually signed to the independent record label Domino Records.

Arctic Monkeys achieved chart success with their first single "I Bet You Look Good on the Dancefloor" which reached number one in the UK Singles Chart. Their first album Whatever People Say I Am, That's What I'm Not, released on 23 January 2006, was at the time the fastest-selling debut album in British music history. It received critical acclaim, winning both the 2006 Mercury Prize and the 2007 BRIT Awards for Best British Album.  The band's second album, Favourite Worst Nightmare, was released on 23 April 2007, sold over 225,000 copies in its debut week, and was nominated for the 2007 Mercury Prize. The group also picked up the award for Best British Album and Best British Group at the BRIT Awards in 2008. Overall, the band has won five BRIT Awards, including "Best British Breakthrough Act" in 2006, "Best British Album" in 2007 for Whatever People Say I Am, That's What I'm Not, and "Best British Group" in 2008. At the NME Awards in 2006, they made history by becoming the first band to win both "Best New Band" and "Best British Band" in the same night. The band were also nominated for 5 Grammy awards. Arctic Monkeys have received 38 awards from 92 nominations.

Brit Awards
The Brit Awards are the British Phonographic Industry's annual pop music awards. Arctic Monkeys have won seven awards from twelve nominations.

|-
|  || Arctic Monkeys || British Breakthrough Act || 
|-
|rowspan="2"|  || Arctic Monkeys || British Group || 
|-
| Whatever People Say I Am, That's What I'm Not || British Album of the Year || 
|-
|rowspan="3"|  ||rowspan="2"| Arctic Monkeys || British Group || 
|-
| British Live Act || 
|-
| Favourite Worst Nightmare || British Album of the Year || 
|-
|  || Arctic Monkeys || British Group || 
|-
|rowspan="2"|  || Arctic Monkeys || British Group || 
|-
| AM || British Album of the Year || 
|-
| 2019 || Arctic Monkeys || British Group || 
|-
|rowspan="2"| 2023|| rowspan="2"| Arctic Monkeys || British Group || 
|-
| Best Rock/Alternative Act ||

GUMMY Awards

GAFFA Awards (Denmark)
Delivered since 1991, the GAFFA Awards are a Danish award that rewards popular music by the magazine of the same name.

!
|-
| rowspan="2"| 2006
| Whatever People Say I Am, That's What I'm Not
| Best Foreign Album
| 
| style="text-align:center;" rowspan="2"|
|-
| Arctic Monkeys
| Best Foreign New Act
| 
|-
| rowspan="2"| 2007
| Favorite Worst Nightmare
| Best Foreign Album
| 
| style="text-align:center;" rowspan="2"|
|-
| rowspan="2"| Arctic Monkeys
| rowspan="2"| Best Foreign Band
| 
|-
| 2019
| 
| style="text-align:center;"|
|-
|}

GAFFA Awards (Norway) 
Delivered since 2012. The GAFFA Awards are a Norwegian award that rewards popular music, awarded by the GAFFA magazine.

!
|-
| rowspan="2" | 2018
| Arctic Monkeys
| Best Foreign Band
| 
|rowspan="2" style="text-align:center;"|
|-
| Tranquility Base Hotel & Casino
| Best Foreign Album
| 
|-
|}

GAFFA Awards (Sweden)
Delivered since 2010, the GAFFA Awards (Swedish: GAFFA Priset) are a Swedish award that rewards popular music awarded by the magazine of the same name.

!
|-
| rowspan="2"| 2019
| Arctic Monkeys
| Best Foreign Band
| 
| style="text-align:center;" rowspan="2"|
|-
| Tranquility Base Hotel & Casino
| Best Foreign Album
| 
|-
|}

Grammy Awards
The Grammy Awards are awarded annually by the National Academy of Recording Arts and Sciences of the United States of America. They have been nominated 6 times with no wins.

|-
|rowspan="2" |  || Whatever People Say I Am, That's What I'm Not || Best Alternative Music Album || 
|-
| "Chun Li's Spinning Bird Kick" || Best Rock Instrumental Performance || 
|-
| || "Do I Wanna Know?" || rowspan="2" |Best Rock Performance || 
|-
|rowspan="2" | 2019 || "Four Out of Five" || 
|-
| Tranquility Base Hotel + Casino || Best Alternative Music Album || 
|-
|2023 || "There'd Better Be a Mirrorball" || Best Alternative Music Performance || 
|-

iHeartRadio Music Awards
The IHeartRadio Music Awards is an international music awards show founded by IHeartRadio in 2014. Arctic Monkeys had a nomination.

|-
| 2015 || "Do I Wanna Know?" || Alternative Rock Song of the Year || 
|-

Ivor Novello Awards
The Ivor Novello Awards are presented annually in London by the British Academy of Composers and Songwriters and was first introduced in 1955. Arctic Monkeys have received one award.

|-
| 2006 || "I Bet You Look Good on the Dancefloor" || rowspan="2"|Best Song Musically and Lyrically || 
|-
| rowspan="2"| 2007 || "When the Sun Goes Down" || 
|-
| Whatever People Say I Am, That's What I'm Not  || rowspan="2"|Album Award || 
|-
| 2013 || AM || 
|-
| 2019 || "Four Out of Five" || Best Song Musically and Lyrically ||

Mercury Prize
The Mercury Prize is a highly prestigious annual music prize awarded for the best album from the United Kingdom and Ireland. Nominations are chosen by a panel of musicians, music executives, journalists and other figures in the music industry in the UK and Ireland.

Arctic Monkeys won the 2006 Mercury Prize with their debut album Whatever People Say I Am, That's What I'm Not. In 2007, their second album Favourite Worst Nightmare received a nomination, and the band was nominated once again in 2013 for their fifth album AM.  Their sixth album Tranquility Base Hotel & Casino was nominated for the award in 2018.

|-
| 2006 || Whatever People Say I Am, That's What I'm Not || Album of the Year || 
|-
| 2007 || Favourite Worst Nightmare || Album of the Year || 
|-
| 2013 || AM || Album of the Year || 
|-
| 2018 || Tranquility Base Hotel & Casino || Album of the Year ||

Meteor Music Awards
The Meteor Music Awards are distributed by MCD Productions and are the national music awards of Ireland. Arctic Monkeys have won one award from three nominations.

|-
|rowspan="3"| 2007 ||rowspan="2"| Arctic Monkeys || Best International Band || 
|-
| Best Live Performance || 
|-
| Whatever People Say I Am, That's What I'm Not || Best International Album ||

MOJO Awards
The MOJO Awards are the UK's annual music awards run by music magazine, MOJO. To date, Arctic Monkeys has won one award.

|-
| 2011 ||  Suck It And See || Best Album || 
|-

MTV Europe Music Awards 
The MTV Europe Music Awards were established in 1994 by MTV Europe to celebrate the most popular music videos in Europe. Arctic Monkeys had five nominations.

MTV Video Music Awards 
The MTV Video Music Awards is an annual awards ceremony established in 1984 by MTV. Arctic Monkeys have received two nominations.

|-
| 2014 || "Do I Wanna Know?" || rowspan="2" | Best Rock Video || 
|-
| 2015 || "Why'd You Only Call Me When You're High?" || 
|-

Music Video Production Awards
The MVPA Awards are annually presented by a Los Angeles-based music trade organization to honor the year's best music videos.

|-
| 2006
| "The View from the Afternoon"
| Best International Video 
|

Muso Awards
The Muso Awards is a charity music award ceremony held in London. Arctic Monkeys have received one award.

|-
| 2005 || Arctic Monkeys || Best New Act ||

NME Awards
Founded by the music magazine NME, the NME Awards are awarded annually. Arctic Monkeys have won 20 awards from 37 nominations.

|-
|rowspan="5"| 2006 ||rowspan="3"| Arctic Monkeys || Best New Band || 
|-
| Best British Band || 
|-
| Best Live Band || 
|-
| Whatever People Say I Am, That's What I'm Not || Album of the Year || 
|-
| "I Bet You Look Good on the Dancefloor" || Best Track || 
|-
|rowspan="2"| 2007 || Whatever People Say I Am, That's What I'm Not || Best Album || 
|-
| Scummy Man || Best Music DVD || 
|-
|rowspan="5"| 2008 ||rowspan="2"| Arctic Monkeys || Best British Band || 
|-
| Best Live Band || 
|-
| Favourite Worst Nightmare || Best Album || 
|-
| "Fluorescent Adolescent" || Best Track || 
|-
| "Teddy Picker" || Best Music Video || 
|-
|rowspan="1"| USA|| Favourite Worst Nightmare || Best International Album || 
|-
|rowspan="1"| 2009 || "Arctic Monkeys at The Apollo" || Best Music DVD || 
|-
|rowspan="7"| 2010 || rowspan="3"| Arctic Monkeys || Best Band || 
|-
| Best Live Band || 
|-
| Giving It Back Fan Award || 
|-
| Humbug || Best Album || 
|-
| "Crying Lightning" || Best Track || 
|-
| "Cornerstone" || Best Video || 
|-
| Alex Turner || Hero of the Year || 
|-
|rowspan="8"| 2012 || rowspan="3"| Arctic Monkeys || Best Band || 
|-
| Best Live Band || 
|-
| Most Dedicated Fans || 
|-
| rowspan="2"| Suck It And See || Best Album || 
|-
| Best Album Artwork || 
|-
| "The Hellcat Spangled Shalalala" || Best Track || 
|-
| "Suck It and See" || Best Video || 
|-
| Alex Turner || Hero of the Year || 
|-
|rowspan="7"| 2014 || rowspan="3"| Arctic Monkeys || Best British Band || 
|-
| Best Live Band || 
|-
| Best Fan Community || 
|-
| AM || Best Album || 
|-
| "R U Mine?"  || Best Track || 
|-
| "Why'd You Only Call Me When You're High?" || Best Music Video || 
|-
| rowspan="2"| Alex Turner || rowspan="2"| Hero of the Year || 
|-
| 2015 ||

PLUG Awards
The PLUG Awards are given in support of indie music. Arctic Monkeys have won one award from two nominations.

|-
|rowspan="3"| 2007 ||rowspan="2"| Arctic Monkeys || New Artist of the Year || 
|-
| Artist of the Year || 
|-
| "I Bet You Look Good on the Dancefloor" || Song of the Year ||

Q Awards
The Q Awards are hosted annually by the music magazine Q. Arctic Monkeys have won five awards from  sixteen nominations.

|-
|rowspan="5"| 2006 ||rowspan="3"| Arctic Monkeys || Best Live Act || 
|-
| Best New Act || 
|-
| People's Choice Award || 
|-
| Whatever People Say I Am, That's What I'm Not || Best Album || 
|-
| "I Bet You Look Good on the Dancefloor" || Best Track || 
|-
|rowspan="3"| 2007 ||rowspan="2"| Arctic Monkeys || Best Act in the World Today || 
|-
| Best Live Act || 
|-
| Favourite Worst Nightmare || Best Album || 
|-
|rowspan="4"| 2009 ||rowspan="2"| Arctic Monkeys || Best Act in the World Today || 
|-
| Best Live Act || 
|-
| Humbug || Best Album || 
|-
| "Crying Lightning" || Best Track || 
|-
|rowspan="4"| 2011 ||rowspan="2"| Arctic Monkeys || Best Act in the World Today || 
|-
| Greatest Act of the Last 25 Years|| 
|-
| Suck It and See || Best Album || 
|-
| "Don't Sit Down 'Cause I've Moved Your Chair" || Best Track || 
|-
| 2012 || "R U Mine?" || Best Video || 
|-
|rowspan="3"| 2013 || "Do I Wanna Know?" || Best Track || 
|-
|rowspan="2"|Arctic Monkeys || Best Live Act || 
|-
| Best Act in the World Today || 
|-
|rowspan="3"| 2014 || "Arabella" || Best Video || 
|-
|rowspan="2"|Arctic Monkeys || Best Live Act || 
|-
| Best Act in the World Today || 
|-
|rowspan="2"| 2018 || Tranquility Base Hotel & Casino || Best Album || 
|-
|Arctic Monkeys || Best Act in the World Today ||

Teen Choice Awards
The Teen Choice Awards were established in 1999 to honor the year's biggest achievements in music, movies, sports and television, being voted by young people aged between 13 and 19. 

|-
| 2006 
| Arctic Monkeys
| Choice Music: Rock Group
|

References 

Awards
Lists of awards received by British musician
Lists of awards received by musical group